Anjali (born 16 June 1986) is an Indian actress and model who appears in Tamil, Telugu, Malayalam and Kannada films. Following a stint in modelling, she was cast in starring roles in two Telugu productions; her debut film was the Telugu thriller film Photo (2006), before bagging a role and gaining attention in the film Kattradhu Thamizh (2007) with Jiiva. In 2010 and 2011, she won the Filmfare Award for Best Actress – Tamil, for her performances in Angaadi Theru and Engaeyum Eppothum respectively and the Tamil Nadu State Film Award for Angadi Theru, subsequently becoming recognised as one of the "finest young actors" in Tamil cinema, and noted for mostly playing "performance-oriented roles".

In 2013, she returned to Telugu cinema and appeared in a string of successful films like Seethamma Vakitlo Sirimalle Chettu, Balupu, Masala, Geethanjali and Dictator. She also received two Nandi Awards for Best Actress for her performances in the films Seethamma Vakitlo Sirimalle Chettu (2013) and Geethanjali (2014).

Early life 
Anjali was born on 16 June 1986 in Razole, East Godavari district, Andhra Pradesh. She has two brothers and a sister. She completed her schooling in Razole and later moved to Chennai where she continued her studies, pursuing a degree in mathematics. After completing her education, she began acting in short films, which paved the way for her entry into the film industry. Anjali remarked that her parents had aspirations to become an actor and that they "realised their dreams" through her.

Career

2006–2008: Debut and breakthrough 

In 2002, Anjali was signed on to appear in director Kalanjiyam's Sathamintri Muthamidu under the screen name of Sundhari, but the film later failed to materialise. The director also began two other films with Anjali, Valiba Desam and En Kanavu Thaanadi, though those also failed to materialise. During one of her modelling assignments, she was spotted by director Siva Nageswara Rao, who offered her a starring role in his Telugu thriller film Photo (2006). Anjali portrayed a ghost haunting her murderers in Photo, which co-starred two more newcomers, Anand and Bhanu. She played the female lead in another Telugu venture, the romance film Premalekha Raasa (2007), directed by lyricist Kulasekhar, opposite a debutant again; both films garnered negative response, and performed poorly at the box office, failing to propel her career in Telugu cinema.

She made her Tamil film début later that year in Kattradhu Thamizh, directed by Ram, which released to strong critical acclaim. Anjali won critical praise for her portrayal of Anandhi, the childhood friend and love interest of a young teacher-turned-psychopath (enacted by Jeeva). A Behindwoods critic wrote that she was "a delight to watch and spellbinds the viewer with her beautiful fresh look and her performance", while Pavithra Srinivasan of Rediff.com described her as "a breath of fresh air" and "the perfect foil to Jeeva's plethora of emotions". Her performance earned her the Vijay Award for Best Debut Actress for that year, and she grew in popularity, leading her to several more offers, albeit the film proved commercially unsuccessful.
She appeared in two films in 2008; Honganasu, her first Kannada project and Aayudham Seivom in Tamil. The latter, which featured her as the female lead opposite Sundar C, was panned by critics and she was criticised for accepting that role, with reviewers noting that she had nothing to do in the film, "except roll her eyes".

2010–2012: Critical acclaim 
She next played Kani, a fiery, independent sales girl in a textile showroom in Angadi Theru (2010) which was released two years after her last venture. The Vasanthabalan-directed tragedy drama focussed on the lives of young employees who work in retail department stores. The film was shot in real location at the Ranganathan Street in T Nagar, Chennai with hidden cameras, with Anjali disclosing that they wore the uniform of a particular textile company, passing off as real sales-people and selling goods. Angadi Theru opened to rave reviews, whilst also fetching Anjali critical acclaim for her performance, which went on to win several accolades, including the Filmfare Award for Best Actress – Tamil. She subsequently appeared in two family drama films; S Pictures' Rettaisuzhi, in which she shared screen with veteran directors Bharathiraja and K Balachandar, and Magizhchi, co-starring and directed by Gowthaman. The latter released to favourable reviews, and Anjali received positive feedback on her performance, being labelled as "impressive", and "almost perfect as the young, a bit mischievous, village girl"; however both films failed to succeed at the box office.

In 2011, she first appeared in Payyans alongside Jayasurya, which marked her début in Malayalam cinema, followed by a lead female role in the Cloud Nine Movies-production Thoonga Nagaram, in which she starred as an anchor in local television, and a cameo appearance in a song in Ko that also featured other lead actors from Tamil cinema. She was then seen in the small-budget drama film Karungali, directed by Kalanjiyam. Kalanjiyam had signed up Anjali, rechristening her as Sundari then, for a film titled Sathamindri Muthamidu, even prior to Kattradhu Thamizh, followed by three more films, all of which were cancelled. Following her rise to fame post Angadi Theru, Kalanjiyam revived one of the projects, namely Karungali, with Anjali agreeing to be part of it, owing to her prior commitments. The film featured her as a childless housewife living in a bad relationship with her husband, and was a critical and commercial failure.
While starring in Thoonga Nagaram, she was offered a minor supporting role in another project of the production studio, Mankatha. The Ajith Kumar-starrer, directed by Venkat Prabhu, was Anjali's first high-budget project and featured her as part of an ensemble cast. The film emerged a financial success and Anjali's highest-grossing film in her career, however her role in the film was small and not well received generally. Meanwhile, she was cast by director AR Murugadoss to perform a lead role in his maiden production Engaeyum Eppothum alongside Jai, Sharwanand and Ananya, directed by his assistant M Saravanan. Anjali essayed the role of a bold and dominating nurse, with critics again heaping praise on her performance. The Hindu wrote that she "has given her best [and] steals the show in the climax", while Rediffs Pavithra Srinivasan cited it was she "who clearly walks away with the honours", adding that "the extent of her feelings emerges only at the end, and carries you away" and calling it a "noteworthy performance". She had her only starring role in 2012 in Sundar C's Kalakalappu. A critic from Deccan Chronicle wrote that "Anjali scores well with her natural performance".

2013–2014: Continued success 

In 2013, she starred in the Telugu multi-starrer Seethamma Vakitlo Sirimalle Chettu along with Venkatesh, Mahesh Babu and Samantha. The film went on to be a critical and commercial success, with many applauses for Anjali from the critics. Mahalakshmi Prabhakaran of DNA India commented that Anjali "as the innocent Seetha...gives an easy breezy but endearing performance". She later starred in AR Murugadoss' next production venture Vathikuchi opposite Dhileban. The film received mixed reviews as did her performance. IndiaGlitz commented "Anjali's character though is sugary; it's a reminiscent of so many of her characters in the past and leaves you with a sense of wanting variation". Her next release was Settai, the Tamil remake of Delhi Belly, in which she starred opposite Arya. The film received mixed reviews, along with her performance. After an item number in Suriya's Singam II, her first in her career, she starred in two Telugu films, Gopichand Malineni's Balupu opposite Ravi Teja and Masala, the Telugu remake of Bol Bachchan, opposite Venkatesh, for the second time in her career. In 2014, she appeared in a horror comedy women-centric film titled Geethanjali for which she received Nandi Award for Best Actress, SICA Award for Best Telugu Actress.

2015–present: Brief setback and comeback 
In early 2015, Anjali returned to Sandalwood and starred opposite Puneeth Rajkumar in Rana Vikrama. Her début film in Kannada was Honganasu seven years ago. She broke the seven-year hiatus with that film. In Tamil, she appeared opposite Jayam Ravi alongside Trisha, Soori in Sakalakala Vallavan. In Telugu, she played a special cameo role of a lady don in Sankarabharanam, a Telugu film which has Nikhil Siddhartha in lead. In 2016, her first release was in Telugu opposite Balayya Balakrishna titled Dictator which was declared a super-hit. Her role was well received by the audience. In Tamil, she starred in Karthik Subbaraj's Iraivi where her performance as the happy go lucky girl turned long suffering wife of Vijay Sethupathi gave her critical acclaim and audience appreciation. Though the film had an average return at the box office, she garned a nomination for Best Performance in a Leading Role- Female (Tamil) at the 2nd IIFA Utsavam.

Later, she signed a psycho action thriller Telugu film Chitrangada (2017). In December 2017, her film with Jai & Janani Iyer titled Balloon directed by newcomer Sinish had a moderate-average performance at the box office. She signed a Tamil film Peranbu (2019) opposite Mammootty directed by Ram, where her performance was overshadowed by Mammooty and Baby Sandhana. She acted in the horror flick, Lisaa (2019) as a lead character, which got below average reviews and collections. Anjali acted as lesbian in the web series Paava Kadhaigal (2020) directed by Vignesh Shivan. The next year she played the role Zarina in the film Vakeel Saab (2021), directed by Venu Sriram. The film was successful at the box-office, grossing over 137.65 crore worldwide, despite the COVID-19 pandemic in India. The film became her comeback success. Following the success, she signed up for a role in the film F3, produced by Sri Venkateswara Creations. However, she was replaced by Sonal Chauhan.

Filmography

Films

Music videos

Television

Awards and honours

References

External links 

 

21st-century Indian actresses
Actresses from Andhra Pradesh
Actresses in Kannada cinema
Actresses in Malayalam cinema
Actresses in Tamil cinema
Actresses in Telugu cinema
Filmfare Awards South winners
Indian film actresses
Living people
People from East Godavari district
Telugu actresses
1986 births